The phrase high command may refer to:

Non-fiction high commands
 High Command of Capital Hanoi (Bộ tư lệnh Thủ đô Hà Nội) of Vietnam
 German high commands up to and during World War I:
 German Imperial Naval High Command (Kaiserliches Oberkommando der Marine), 1889-1899 German naval command
 High Command of Coastal Defence (Küstenverteidigung), World War I German coastal defence
 German high commands up to and during World War II:
 German High Command (Oberkommando der Wehrmacht, OKW),  German armed-forces command structure, 1938-1945
 German Army High Command (Oberkommando des Heeres, OKH), de facto World War II German command on the Eastern front
 Oberkommando der Luftwaffe (OKL), Luftwaffe high command, 1935-1945
 Oberkommando der Marine (OKM), Kriegsmarine high command, 1936-1945
 German High SS and Police Leader command (Höhere SS und Polizeiführer, HSSPF), 1939–1945, reporting only to Reichsführer SS Heinrich Himmler
 High Command Trial, post-World War II war-crimes trial
 Norwegian High Command (Forsvarets Overkommando), Norway's top military leadership from 1970 to 2003
 Mobile Barracks of High Command (行轅), Chinese government regional office on behalf of a military commander
 Stavka, the military high command of Russian and Soviet armed forces

In fiction
 Vulcan High Command, in the fictional Star Trek universe
 Squirrel High Command, in the action-adventure video game series Conker
 The High Command, a 1938 British drama film
 Squadron Supreme: High Command, a collected edition of the Marvel Comics series Squadron Supreme

See also
 Commander-in-Chief
 Defence minister
 Chain of command
 Command (military formation)
 Staff (military)
 Warlord